Deeg Palace is a Palace in Deeg & 32 km from city of Bharatpur in Bharatpur district in  Rajasthan, India. It is built in 1772 as a luxurious summer resort for the rulers of Bharatpur State. The palace was in active use till the early 1970s. Deeg Palace is the only palace of Hindu style in the whole of North India

History and architecture
Deeg was the capital of the Jat kings before they shifted to Bharatpur. Badan Singh, who came to the throne in 1721, built a palace here. Due to its strategic location and proximity to Agra, Deeg had to face repeated attacks by invaders. His son, prince Suraj Mal, began the construction of a fortress around the palace around 1730. The fort had massive walls and a deep moat to keep away raiders.

Deeg was a site of a legendary battle between the Jats and a combined Mughal and Maratha army of 8,000 men. Emboldened by his victory, Suraj Mal began making forays into enemy territory. After eight years of success in his forays, Suraj Mal captured Delhi and plundered the Red Fort carrying away masses of valuables including an entire marble building, which was dismantled and numbered. The palace was then reconstructed at Deeg.

The Jat rulers were influenced by the magnificence of the Mughal courts of Agra and Delhi. The design of the gardens has been inspired by the Mughal Charbagh. The palace forms a quadrangle with a garden and walkways at its centre. Decorative flowerbeds, shrubs, trees and fountains cool the place considerably during summer. Two huge water tanks, Gopal Sagar and Rup Sagar, on either side also helped to bring down the temperature.

Keshav Bhawan, the monsoon pavilion, is a single-storeyed baradari placed on an octagonal base. It stands next to the Rup Sagar tank. The edifice has five arches along each side which seem to divide it in to parts. An arcade runs around the interior of the pavilion over a canal with hundreds of fountains. The walls of the canal are pierced with hundreds of minute water jets. Bullocks were employed with large leather "buckets" to draw water to the tank through a complex pulley system.

In festivals such as Holi, colours are added to the water. Small cloth pouches with organic colours were manually inserted into the holes in the reservoir wall. When the water flowed through them passing along an intricate network of pipelines, the fountains spouted coloured water.

The fountain spray and the jets create a monsoon-like ambience that is enhanced by a unique technique that produces thunder-like sound all around the pavilion. Hundreds of metal balls placed strategically on the channel surrounding the roof are set rolling with the water pressure which results in a thunderous effect. The ambience in a desert town must have been significant for the Jat kings and queens.

King's bedroom contains an enormous black granite bed of the Maharaja. It had once served as a part of Parsi death rites, functioning as a platform for washing dead bodies.

In relation to Deeg fort it is written in Intakakhbutwarikh –

"Deeg and Delhi were at that time the center of equal beauty and trade, Deeg was the first class among the protected places of fortifications of India."

Visiting
Deeg Palace is open from 9 am to 5 pm except on Fridays. The nearest airports are at Agra (70 km) and Delhi (200 km). The nearest railhead is Bharatpur junction (35 km).

Deeg is four hours by road from Delhi, two hours from Agra and one hour from Mathura.

February and March are the best months to see this lovely garden-palace, Suraj Mals fairy creation, at its best; when the fountains are playing, the flowering bushes are just coming out, the roses in the parterres are all in bloom, and the soft cool green of the mango, jaman, amalaka, and nim trees has not yet been spoiled by the hot, dusty winds of the Indian spring.

Gallery

See also 

Deeg
Bharatpur

References

Palaces in Rajasthan
Forts in Rajasthan
History of Bharatpur, Rajasthan
Residential buildings completed in 1772
Buildings and structures of the Jats
Bharatpur district
Tourist attractions in Bharatpur district